The discography of Rosenstolz, a German pop duo from Berlin, includes 12 studio albums and at least 40 singles, released between 1992 and 2012. The band also released a number of live albums, six compilation albums and video albums.

Rosenstolz's first chart hit was "Herzensschöner", which reached No. 34 in the German singles chart in 1998. However, it was not until 2000 with the release of the single "Amo Vitam" that the band received frequent airplay on German music television stations. The following year, "Es könnt' ein Anfang sein" became the band's first German top 10 single. Rosenstolz's great breakthrough in Germany then came in 2004 with the album Herz, which reached triple platinum status and gave rise to four top 20 singles, including "Liebe ist alles" and "Willkommen".  Major chart hits from later albums were "Ich bin ich (Wir sind wir)", "Gib mir Sonne" and "Wir sind am Leben", which peaked at No. 2, No. 1 and No. 3, respectively, in the German singles chart.

Although none of Rosenstolz's songs from the early to mid-nineties entered the charts, some of them remained regular features of Rosenstolz concerts in later years. These songs included "Schlampenfieber", "Nur einmal noch", "Lachen", "Der Moment", "Die Schlampen sind müde" and "Königin". A notable song was "Schlampenfieber", which was performed in a different musical style for each concert tour.

Five of Rosenstolz's studio albums went straight to No. 1 in the German albums chart: Kassengift (2000), Herz (2004), Das große Leben (2006), Die Suche geht weiter (2008) and Wir sind am Leben (2011). The last three of these albums also reached No. 1 in Austria and charted highly in Switzerland. Rosenstolz's most commercially successful album was Das große Leben, which sold over one million copies in Germany and also received platinum and gold statuses in Austria and Switzerland, respectively.

Albums

Studio albums

Live albums

Compilation albums

Video albums

Karaoke albums

Other albums 
In 1998, Rosenstolz parted ways with producer Tom Müller. He retained control of some of Rosenstolz's earlier recordings and these have been re-released over the years as various compilation albums by record label Musik für Erwachsene (MfE). The following MfE compilations are not listed in the discography on the official Rosenstolz website.

Singles

Box sets

Demo cassettes 
Prior to the release of the debut album Soubrette werd' ich nie, Rosenstolz produced three different music cassettes that were sold privately. A selection of demo songs from these cassettes can be found in the 2007 deluxe edition of  Soubrette werd' ich nie as a bonus CD. In addition, the limited super deluxe edition of Wir sind am Leben includes a Rosenstolz music cassette from 1991 as well as a CD version of the cassette.

Notes

References

External links
Rosenstolz music videos (Adobe Flash) at Universal Music Group website (streamed copy where licensed) 

Discographies of German artists
Pop music discographies